The 1992 Kazakhstan Cup was the first season of the Kazakhstan Cup, the annual nationwide football cup competition of Kazakhstan since the independence of the country. The competition began on 8 May 1992, and ended with the final in August 1992.

First round

Second round

Quarter-finals

Semi-finals

Final

External links 
 Results

References

1992
Cup
1992 domestic association football cups